Carn Dearg Mor (857 m) is a mountain in the Grampian Mountains of Scotland. It lies in the Badenoch and Strathspey area of Inverness-shire, east of the town of Kingussie.

The peak is usually climbed from Glen Feshie to the east, and despite being an undistinguished summit, it provides fantastic views of the surrounding area.

References

Marilyns of Scotland
Corbetts
Mountains and hills of Highland (council area)